Pavel Kondr (born 25 March 1942) is a Czech former cyclist. He competed for Czechoslovakia in the team pursuit at the 1968 Summer Olympics.

References

External links
 
 

1942 births
Living people
Czech male cyclists
Olympic cyclists of Czechoslovakia
Cyclists at the 1968 Summer Olympics
Sportspeople from Plzeň